The revenue recognition principle is a cornerstone of accrual accounting together with the matching principle. They both determine the accounting period in which revenues and expenses are recognized. According to the principle, revenues are recognized when they are realized or realizable, and are earned (usually when goods are transferred or services rendered), no matter when cash is received. In cash accounting—in contrast—revenues are recognized when cash is received no matter when goods or services are sold.

Cash can be received in an earlier or later period than obligations are met (when goods or services are delivered) and related revenues are recognized that results in the following two types of accounts:
 Accrued revenue: Revenue is recognized before cash is received.
 Deferred revenue: Revenue is recognized when cash is received.
Revenue realized during an accounting period is included in the income.

International Financial Reporting Standards criteria 

The IFRS provides five criteria for identifying the critical event for recognizing revenue on the sale of goods:
 Risks and rewards have been transferred from the seller to the buyer.
 The seller has no control over the goods sold.
 Collection of payment is reasonably assured.
 The amount of revenue can be reasonably measured.
 Costs of earning the revenue can be reasonably measured.

The first two criteria mentioned above are referred to as Performance. Performance occurs when the seller has done most or all of what it is supposed to do to be entitled for the payment. E.g.: A company has sold the good and the customer walks out of the store with no warranty on the product. The seller has completed its performance since the buyer now owns good and also all the risks and rewards associated with it. The third criterion is referred to as Collectability. The seller must have a reasonable expectation of being paid. An allowance account must be created if the seller is not fully assured to receive the payment. The fourth and fifth criteria are referred to as Measurability. Due to Matching Principle, the seller must be able to match expenses to the revenues they helped in earning. Therefore, the amount of Revenues and Expenses should both be reasonably measurable.

General rule 
Received advances are not recognized as revenues, but as liabilities (deferred income), until the following conditions are met:
 Revenues are realized when cash or claims to cash (receivable) are received. Revenues are realizable when they are readily convertible to cash or claim to cash.
 Revenues are earned when such goods/services are transferred/rendered.

Recognition of revenue from four types of transactions:
 Revenues from selling inventory are recognized at the date of sale often interpreted as the date of delivery.
 Revenues from rendering services are recognized when services are completed and billed.
 Revenue from permission to use company's assets (e.g. interest for using money, rent for using fixed assets, and royalties for using intangible assets) is recognized as time passes or as assets are used.
 Revenue from selling an asset other than inventory is recognized at the point of sale, when it takes place.

Revenue versus cash timing 
Accrued revenue (or accrued assets) is an asset such as proceeds from delivery of goods or services. Income is earned at time of delivery, with the related revenue item recognized as accrued revenue. Cash for them is to be received in a later accounting period, when the amount is deducted from accrued revenues.

Deferred revenue (or deferred income) is a liability, such as cash received from a counterpart for goods or services which are to be delivered in a later accounting period. When the delivery takes place, income is earned, the related revenue item is recognized, and the deferred revenue is reduced.

For example, a company receives an annual software license fee paid out by a customer upfront on January 1. However the company's fiscal year ends on May 31. So, the company using accrual accounting adds only five months worth (5/12) of the fee to its revenues in profit and loss for the fiscal year the fee was received. The rest is added to deferred income (liability) on the balance sheet for that year.

Advances 
Advances are not considered to be a sufficient evidence of sale; thus, no revenue is recorded until the sale is completed. Advances are considered a deferred income and are recorded as liabilities until the whole price is paid and the delivery made (i.e. matching obligations are incurred).

Exceptions

Revenues not recognized at sale 
The rule says that revenue from selling inventory is recognized at the point of sale, but there are several exceptions.
 Buyback agreements: buyback agreement means that a company sells a product and agrees to buy it back after some time. If buyback price covers all costs of the inventory plus related holding costs, the inventory remains on the seller's books. In plain: there was no sale.
 Returns: companies which cannot reasonably estimate the amount of future returns and/or have extremely high rates of returns should recognize revenues only when the right to return expires. Those companies that can estimate the number of future returns and have a relatively small return rate can recognize revenues at the point of sale, but must deduct estimated future returns.

Revenues recognized before sale

Long-term contracts 
This exception primarily deals with long-term contracts such as constructions (buildings, stadiums, bridges, highways, etc.), development of aircraft, weapons, and spaceflight systems. Such contracts must allow the builder (seller) to bill the purchaser at various parts of the project (e.g. every 10 miles of road built).
The percentage-of-completion method says that if the contract clearly specifies the price and payment options with transfer of ownership, the buyer is expected to pay the whole amount and the seller is expected to complete the project, then revenues, costs, and gross profit can be recognized each period based upon the progress of construction (that is, percentage of completion). For example, if during the year, 25% of the building was completed, the builder can recognize 25% of the expected total profit on the contract. This method is preferred. However, expected loss should be recognized fully and immediately due to conservatism constraint. Apart from accounting requirement, there is a need for calculating the percentage of completion for comparing budgets and actuals to control the cost of long-term projects and optimize Material, Man, Machine, Money and time (OPTM4). The method used for determining revenue of a long-term contract can be complex. Usually two methods are employed to calculate the percentage of completion: (i) by calculating the percentage of accumulated cost incurred to the total budgeted cost; (ii) by determining the percentage of deliverable completed as a percentage of total deliverable. The second method is accurate but cumbersome. To achieve this, one needs the help of a software ERP package which integrates Financial, inventory, Human resources and WBS (work breakdown structure) based planning and scheduling while booking of all cost components should be done with reference to one of the WBS elements. There are very few contracting ERP software packages which have the complete integrated module to do this.
The completed-contract method should be used only if percentage-of-completion is not applicable or the contract involves extremely high risks. Under this method, revenues, costs, and gross profit are recognized only after the project is fully completed. Thus, if a company is working only on one project, its income statement will show $0 revenues and $0 construction-related costs until the final year. However, expected loss should be recognized fully and immediately due to conservatism constraint.

Completion of production basis 
This method allows recognizing revenues even if no sale was made. This applies to agricultural products and minerals. There is a ready market for these products with reasonably assured prices, the units are interchangeable, and selling and distributing does not involve significant costs.

Revenues recognized after Sale 
Sometimes, the collection of receivables involves a high level of risk. If there is a high degree of uncertainty regarding collectibility then a company must defer the recognition of revenue. There are three methods which deal with this situation:
 Installment sales method allows recognizing income after the sale is made, and proportionately to the product of gross profit percentage and cash collected calculated. The unearned income is deferred and then recognized to income when cash is collected. For example, if a company collected 45% of total product price, it can recognize 45% of total profit on that product.
 Cost recovery method is used when there is an extremely high probability of uncollectable payments. Under this method no profit is recognized until cash collections exceed the seller's cost of the merchandise sold. For example, if a company sold a machine worth $10,000 for $15,000, it can start recording profit only when the buyer pays more than $10,000. In other words, for each dollar collected greater than $10,000 goes towards your anticipated gross profit of $5,000.
 Deposit method is used when the company receives cash before sufficient transfer of ownership occurs. Revenue is not recognized because the risks and rewards of ownership have not transferred to the buyer.
 Generally accepted accounting principles
 Comparison of cash and accrual methods of accounting
 Vendor-specific objective evidence

Revenue Recognition under ASC 606 / IFRS 15 
On May 28, 2014, the FASB and IASB issued converged guidance on recognizing revenue in contracts with customers. The new guidance is heralded by the Boards as a major achievement in efforts to improve financial reporting. The update was issued as Accounting Standards Update (ASU) 2014-09. It will be part of the Accounting Standards Codification (ASC) as Topic 606: Revenue from Contracts with Customers (ASC 606), and supersedes the existing revenue recognition literature in Topic 605 issued by FASB. ASC 606 is effective for public entities for the first interim period within annual reporting periods beginning after December 15, 2017; non-public companies were allowed an additional year.

The new standard aims to:
 Remove inconsistencies and weaknesses in revenue requirements
 Provide a more robust framework for addressing revenue issues
 Improve comparability of revenue recognition practices across entities, industries, jurisdictions, and capital markets
 Provide more useful information to users of financial statements through improved disclosure requirements
 Simplify the preparation of financial statements by reducing the number of requirements to which an entity must refer
The new revenue guidance was issued by the IASB as IFRS 15. The IASB’s standard, as amended, is effective for the first interim period within annual reporting periods beginning on or after January 1, 2018, with early adoption permitted.

Under the new standard, revenue recognition is performed using a five-step process:
 Identify the contract(s) with a customer. An entity shall account for a contract with a customer only when all of the following criteria are met:
 The parties to the contract have approved the contract (in writing, orally, or in accordance with other customary business practices) and are committed to perform their respective obligations.
 The entity can identify each party's rights regarding the goods or services to be transferred.
 The entity can identify the payment terms for the goods or services to be transferred.
 The contract has commercial substance (that is, the risk, timing, or amount of the entity's future cash flows is expected to change as a result of the contract).
 It is probable that the entity will collect substantially all of the consideration to which it will be entitled in exchange for the goods or services that will be transferred to the customer (see paragraphs 606-10-55-3A through 55-3C). In evaluating whether collectibility of an amount of consideration is probable, an entity shall consider only the customer's ability and intention to pay that amount of consideration when it is due. The amount of consideration to which the entity will be entitled may be less than the price stated in the contract if the consideration is variable because the entity may offer the customer a price concession (see paragraph 606-10-32-7).
 Identify the performance obligations in the contract. Performance obligations are promises to provide a good or service (or bundle of goods or services) that are distinct or a series of distinct goods or services that are substantially the same and that have the same pattern of transfer to the customer. Promised goods and services may include:
 Sale of goods produced by an entity (for example, inventory of a manufacturer)
 Resale of goods purchased by an entity (for example, merchandise of a retailer)
 Resale of rights to goods or services purchased by an entity (for example, a ticket resold by an entity acting as a principal) 
 Performing a contractually agreed-upon task (or tasks) for a customer
 Providing a service of standing ready to provide goods or services (for example, unspecified updates to software that are provided on a when-and-if-available basis) or of making goods or services available for a customer to use as and when the customer decides 
 Providing a service of arranging for another party to transfer goods or services to a customer (for example, acting as an agent of another party) 
 Granting rights to goods or services to be provided in the future that a customer can resell or provide to its customer (for example, an entity selling a product to a retailer promises to transfer an additional good or service to an individual who purchases the product from the retailer)
 Constructing, manufacturing, or developing an asset on behalf of a customer 
 Granting licenses to intellectual property
 Granting options to purchase additional goods or services (when those options provide a customer with a material right).
 Determine the transaction price. The transaction price is the amount of consideration to which an entity expects to be entitled in exchange for transferring promised goods or services to a customer, excluding amounts collected on behalf of third parties (for example, some sales taxes). The consideration promised in a contract with a customer may include fixed amounts, variable amounts, or both.
 Allocate the transaction price to the performance obligations in the contract. To meet the allocation objective, an entity shall allocate the transaction price to each performance obligation identified in the contract on a relative standalone selling price basis, except for certain discounts and variable consideration that relate only to specific performance obligation(s) in the contract. Step 4 does not apply to contracts with only one performance obligation, except it may apply if the performance obligation is a series of distinct goods and/or services and the contract includes variable consideration.
 Recognize revenue when (or as) the entity satisfies a performance obligation. Revenue is recognized at a point in time, when control of the promised goods or services transfers to the customer, or over time, as the entity performs, if one of the following criteria is met:
 The customer simultaneously receives and consumes the benefits provided by the entity's performance as the entity performs.
 The entity's performance creates or enhances an asset (for example, work in process) that the customer controls as the asset is created or enhanced.
 The entity's performance does not create an asset with an alternative use to the entity, and the entity has an enforceable right to payment for performance completed to date.

References

Sources 
 

Revenue
Accounting terminology